Bathytoma episoma is a species of sea snail, a marine gastropod mollusk in the family Borsoniidae.

Distribution
This marine species occurs in the Bohol Sea, the Philippines.

Description
The height of this species varies between 55 mm and 80 mm.

References

 Puillandre N., Sysoev A.V., Olivera B.M., Couloux A. & Bouchet P. (2010) Loss of planktotrophy and speciation: geographical fragmentation in the deep-water gastropod genus Bathytoma (Gastropoda, Conoidea) in the western Pacific. Systematics and Biodiversity 8(3): 371-394

External links
 
 MNHN, Paris: Bathytoma episoma (holotype)

episoma
Gastropods described in 2010